This is a list of the seasons completed by the Georgetown Hoyas men's basketball team, the most successful and well-known sports program at Georgetown University. It won the NCAA Men's Division I Basketball Championship in 1984 (over the University of Houston) under coach John Thompson, Jr.  The Hoyas also reached and lost the championship game in 1943 (to Wyoming), 1982 (to North Carolina), and 1985 (to Big East rival Villanova). The Hoyas have appeared in the NCAA Tournament 31 times in all, making it to the Final Four in 1943, 1982, 1984, 1985, and 2007.

The Hoyas have appeared in the National Invitation Tournament (NIT) thirteen times – turning down an invitation to the NIT on a fourteenth occasion – and twice have advanced to the NIT final, losing in 1993 to Minnesota and in 2003 to Big East rival St. John's.

The team was very successful in the original Big East Conference of 1979-2013: it won or tied for the regular-season conference title in 1980, 1984, 1987, 1989, 1992, 2007, and 2008, and won regular-season division titles in 1996 and 1997. The team was even more dominant in the Big East men's basketball tournament during the 1980s: it won in 1980, 1982, 1984, 1985, 1987, and 1989, and later won in 2007 as well. Georgetown and six other Big East universities left the original Big East Conference to join a new Big East Conference in 2013, the old Big East conference then renaming itself the American Athletic Conference (marketed as "the American"). Georgetown won its first Big East tournament in the new Big East in 2021, its eight total tournament championships the most of any team in the combined history of the two Big East Conferences.

During the five seasons immediately preceding the formation of the original Big East, Georgetown was very successful in the Eastern College Athletic Conference's regional Division I ECAC Men's Basketball Tournaments for Northeastern independents, winning regional championships in 1975, 1976, and 1979.

Georgetown was a founding member of the Eastern Intercollegiate Conference (EIC) in 1932 and remained a member until the conference disbanded in 1939. Georgetown was the EIC's regular-season co-champion in 1939.

Seasons

Season notes
  An elected student manager, Lou Murray, led the team during the 1906-07 season.
  The Eastern Intercollegiate Conference had no postseason tournament, but in previous seasons it had held a single-game playoff to determine the conference champion in the event of a first-place tie at the end of the regular season. At the end of the 1938–39 season, Georgetown and Carnegie Tech finished tied for first with identical 6-4 conference records, but no playoff game took place. Instead, the teams were declared conference co-champions.
  Although an independent, Georgetown participated from 1975 to 1979 in one of the regional end-of-season ECAC tournaments organized by the Eastern College Athletic Conference – a loosely organized sports federation of Eastern colleges and universities – for ECAC members which played as independents during the regular season. Each of these regional tournaments gave its winner an automatic bid to that years NCAA tournament in the same manner as conference tournaments of conventional conferences. Georgetown played in the ECAC South Region Tournament from 1975 to 1977, winning it in 1975 and 1976, and in the ECAC South-Upstate Region Tournament in 1978 and 1979, winning it in 1979.
  From the 1995–96 through 1997–98 seasons, the original Big East Conference was divided into the Big East 6 and Big East 7 divisions. Georgetown played in the Big East 7 Division during all three seasons.
  Thompson resigned at midseason on January 8, 1999 after going 7–6 overall and 0–4 in conference play. Craig Esherick immediately succeeded him as head coach, going 8–10 overall and 6–8 in conference play. Esherick led the team to a 10th-place conference finish, a first-round loss in the 1999 National Invitation Tournament, and an overall record of 15–16.
  From the 2000–01 through 2002–03 seasons, the original Big East Conference was divided into the East and West divisions. Georgetown played in the West Division during all three seasons.
  Georgetown declined an invitation to the 2002 National Invitation Tournament.
  Georgetown completed play in the 2020 Big East Men's Basketball Tournament, losing in the first round. The following day, the Big East Conference announced during halftime of the first game of the quarterfinals that the remainder of that game and the rest of the tournament had been cancelled due to the COVID-19 pandemic. The NCAA subsequently cancelled the 2020 NCAA Division I Men's Basketball Tournament and the 2020 National Invitation Tournament due to the COVID-19 pandemic.

Record summary
Totals (1906-2023)
Seasons: 115 (in 117 years)
Record
 Overall: 1712–1129, .603
 Eastern Intercollegiate Conference (1932-1939): 27–39, .409
 Big East Conference (1979–2013): 338–220, .606
 Big East Conference (2013- ): 95–120, .442Regular-Season Division Championships: 2Big East 7 Division (1995-1998): 2Big East West Division (2000-2003): 0Regular-Season Conference Championships: 8 Eastern Intercollegiate Conference (1932-1939): 1 Big East Conference (1979-2013): 7 Big East Conference (2013- ): 0Conference tournament championships: Eastern College Athletic Conference (ECAC) regional tournaments (1975-1979): 3 Big East Conference (1979-2013): 7 
 Big East Conference (2013- ): 1NCAA tournament: Appearances: 31 Final Four appearances: 5 National championships: 1 Overall record: 47–30, .610National Invitation Tournament Appearances: 13 Championships: 0 Overall record: 15–14, .517'''

Postseason tournament results

Notes

References
Georgetown Hoyas men's basketball record book. Retrieved 2013-Sep-24.
hoyabasketball.com The Georgetown Basketball History Project: Year By Year Records

 
Georgetown
Georgetown Hoyas basketball seasons